Adirondack Beverages is a beverage company in the New York state area.

History
In the 1990s, Adirondack Beverages was acquired by Polar Beverages.

Products
They produce many flavors of carbonated beverages including a cola named Adirondack Cola and a line of low-calorie drinks under the label Waist Watcher, which is licensed by Weight Watchers International.

References

Drink companies of the United States
Manufacturing companies based in New York (state)
Food and drink companies based in New York (state)
Food and drink companies established in 1967
1967 establishments in New York (state)